The Bosnia and Herzegovina national football team represents Bosnia and Herzegovina in international football competitions, and is governed by the Football Association of Bosnia and Herzegovina. Until 1992, Bosnian footballers played for Yugoslavia.

Bosnia and Herzegovina achieved their best result when they reached the 2014 FIFA World Cup as winners of their qualifying group. They were eliminated after narrow group stage losses to Argentina and Nigeria and a win over Iran.

The national team has appeared in numerous other qualification play-offs, including the 2010 FIFA World Cup play-offs loss to Portugal, as well as the qualifying play-offs for UEFA Euro 2012, 2016 and 2020, losing to Portugal, the Republic of Ireland and Northern Ireland respectively, preventing the team from reaching their first UEFA European Championship.

The team's highest FIFA World Ranking was 13th, achieved in August 2013.

History

Bosnia and Herzegovina have seen a steady rise in their fortunes on the international football stage in recent times. Historically, Bosnia and Herzegovina has managed multiple play-off appearances and has qualified for one FIFA World Cup. More often than not, the team produces solid results in qualifiers and challenges for a top spot.

From 1920 to 1992, the players lined up for Yugoslavia, but following the outbreak of the Bosnian War and subsequent independence, a new football nation arose from the ashes.

The early period saw Bosnia and Herzegovina have to wait until the 1998 FIFA World Cup qualifiers to compete for a place in a major competition. Bosnia and Herzegovina finished fourth in a group that included Greece, Denmark, Croatia and Slovenia. This was then subsequently followed by further disappointment with lackluster campaigns in the UEFA Euro 2000 qualifiers, as well as the 2002 FIFA World Cup.

This early period was followed by Bosnia and Herzegovina coming very close to qualifying directly for their first ever major competition, UEFA Euro 2004, narrowly missing out by a single goal against Denmark.

Bosnia and Herzegovina failed to make the grade in the 2006 FIFA World Cup qualifiers, despite being unbeaten at home, and the UEFA Euro 2008 qualifiers, which saw their poor home form cost them. Bosnia and Herzegovina then experienced double heartbreak, bowing out twice in the playoffs to Portugal, first 2–0 on aggregate in the 2010 FIFA World Cup decider and then 6–2 on aggregate in the UEFA Euro 2012 decider.

Bosnia and Herzegovina qualified for the 2014 FIFA World Cup, hosted by Brazil, in October 2013 by beating Lithuania, finally breaking their curse and participating in a major tournament.

They managed to finish third in a group which included Argentina, and tasted their first victory thanks to a 3–1 win over Iran. Nigeria pipped Bosnia and Herzegovina for second place in the group with a 1–0 win marred with controversy following an incorrectly disallowed goal scored by Edin Džeko in the first half.

Bosnia and Herzegovina finished third in the UEFA Euro 2016 qualifiers behind Belgium and Wales. After making an unfortunate start to the qualifiers with a surprise 2–1 home defeat against Cyprus and managing just two points through four games, manager Safet Sušić was dismissed and replaced by Mehmed Baždarević.

After the slow start, Bosnian performance improved dramatically, with five wins in their remaining six matches, including victories over Wales and Israel along with three clean sheets. However, they ultimately failed to qualify after a two legged playoff encounter with the Republic of Ireland. Bosnia and Herzegovina failed to make back-to-back FIFA World Cups after failing to qualify to the 2018 FIFA World Cup.

Bosnia and Herzegovina finished fourth in their UEFA Euro 2020 qualifying group with manager Robert Prosinečki, missing out on direct qualification. However, they qualified for the playoffs through their performance in the UEFA Nations League, and with new manager Dušan Bajević, they ultimately missed out on yet another Euro after losing to Northern Ireland on penalties.

Following several years of disappointment, Bulgarian Ivaylo Petev was named as Bosnia and Herzegovina's new manager, marking the first time a Bosnia and Herzegovina manager was not from the former Yugoslavia. In their first campaign under Petev, Bosnia and Herzegovina were drawn in a group with 2018 FIFA World Cup champions France and kept their chances of qualification alive until the final two matches; ultimately failing to qualify for the 2022 FIFA World Cup.

Team image

Nickname
A popular nickname of all Bosnian national teams is "Zmajevi" (Bosnian, Serbian and Croatian for "dragons"), popularized by football TV commentator Mustafa Mijajlović during the Belgium vs. Bosnia and Herzegovina (2–4) 2010 WC qualification game on 28 March 2009.

General agreement among Bosnia and Herzegovina sports fans is that this nickname has historical context, as it is considered as an allusion to the famous Bosnian general Husein Gradaščević, who fought for Bosnian independence, and who was known as the "Dragon of Bosnia".

In both local and foreign media, they are sometimes referred to as the Golden Lilies, which was the original nickname given to all of the country's national teams by fans after independence, in reference to the official state insignia at the time (the flag and the coat of arms), which itself referred to the golden lily, the historical state insignia that was featured on the coat of arms of the ruling Bosnian medieval Kotromanić dynasty.

Home stadiums

Currently, the national team uses Grbavica Stadium as its home ground following its renovation in 2018.

Bosnia and Herzegovina also uses Bilino Polje Stadium, located in the city of Zenica, for many of its home games. The stadium, built and opened in 1972, underwent many reconstruction works since 2012 in order to comply with standards needed to host international games.

Another stadium Bosnia and Herzegovina has used is Koševo City Stadium.

Its training ground for domestic matches is the Bosnia and Herzegovina FA Training Centre in Zenica, which was opened in 2013 in conjunction with UEFA.

Supporters

A large number of national team's supporters come from Northern and Western Europe, North America, and some from as far away as Australia. Most of these fans are members of BHFanaticos, Belaj Boys, BHLegion, Armija Zmajeva (Dragons Army) and Ljuti Krajišnici groups.

In the game against Norway, at the Ullevål Stadium in Oslo on 24 March 2007, Bosnian fans caused an hour-long delay due to an unprecedented amount of flares that had been thrown onto the pitch in protest against corruption in the (now former) Football Federation of Bosnia. On 1 June 2008, former Bosnia and Herzegovina players Meho Kodro and Elvir Bolić organised a friendly humanitarian game in Sarajevo called "Kodro, Bola and Friends" between former Bosnian football legends, in order to gain support, to say its time for changes in the Bosnian Football Association. The game was organised to commence at the same time as Bosnia and Herzegovina national side faced Azerbaijan in a friendly in Zenica. The attendance in Sarajevo was 15,000 while in Zenica only about 50. The game in Sarajevo was organised by the Federalna TV who broadcast the humanitarian game live.
A significant number of Bosnian International players were involved in the game, which ended 11–9 in favour of Team Kodro.

Before every game, during the playing of the Bosnian national anthem, BH Fanaticos sing lyrics from the old national anthem Jedna si jedina, as the current national anthem does not have any official lyrics.

Kits

Bosnia and Herzegovina's traditional kit colours are blue and white, taken from the country's flag. While the current home kits are primarily blue, and the away kits are primarily white, this colour scheme was initially used in reverse order. This is due to the fact that the flag of the Republic of Bosnia and Herzegovina (RBiH), used before the Dayton Agreement, was predominately white.

The team kit is currently produced by Spanish sports company Kelme. The general sponsor of the team is m:tel. Also sponsoring the team are Ziraat Bank and ASA Osiguranje.

The table below shows the history of kit manufacturers for the national football team of Bosnia and Herzegovina:

Recent results and forthcoming fixtures

2022

2023

Coaching staff

Current technical staff

Coaching history

Players

Current squad
The following players were called up for UEFA Euro 2024 qualifying games against Iceland on 23 March and Slovakia on 26 March 2023.

Caps and goals correct as of 26 September 2022, after the match against Romania.

Recent call-ups
The following players have been called up to the team within the last twelve months:

{{nat fs r player|no=|pos=MF|name=Adi Nalić|age=|caps=8|goals=0|club=Hammarby|clubnat=SWE|latest=v. , 29 March 2022}}

INJ Withdrawn due to injury or illness
RET Retired from the national team
SUS Suspended
WD Withdrawn

StatisticsPlayers in bold are still active with Bosnia and Herzegovina.''

Most appearances

Most goals

Most clean sheets

Captains
Emir Spahić captained Bosnia at their first ever FIFA World Cup tournament.
This is a list of Bosnia and Herzegovina captains for ten or more matches.

Note: Some of the other players to have captained the team include: Mehmed Baždarević (2 caps) 1996, Meho Kodro (5) 1997 to 1998, Vlatko Glavaš (1) 1997, Suvad Katana (2) 1998, Elvir Bolić (6) 1999 to 2000, Bruno Akrapović (4) 1999 to 2003, Hasan Salihamidžić (1) 2004, Zlatan Bajramović (1) 2006, Džemal Berberović (1) 2007, Asmir Begović (6) 2011 to 2020, Haris Medunjanin (4) 2016 to 2018, Vedad Ibišević (1) 2017, Miralem Pjanić (6) 2019 to 2021, Ermin Bičakčić (1) 2019, Sead Kolašinac (2) 2021 to 2022, Ibrahim Šehić (1) 2021, Siniša Saničanin (1) 2021, Eldar Ćivić (1) 2021, Adnan Kovačević (1) 2021, Ajdin Nukić (1) 2021, Smail Prevljak (1) 2022.

Table correct as of match played on 26 September 2022.

Competitive record

FIFA World Cup

UEFA European Championship

UEFA Nations League

Minor tournaments

FIFA ranking history
FIFA-ranking yearly averages for Bosnia and Herzegovina. Their average position since FIFA World Ranking creation is 58.

Head-to-head record
Tables correct as of match played on 26 September 2022.
Bosnia and Herzegovina's all-time international record, 1995–present

Bosnia and Herzegovina's all-time record sorted by FIFA Confederations, 1995–present

Notable victories
Source: Results
Unofficial games not included.

Honours
UEFA Nations League B
Winners (2): 2018–19, 2022–23

Minor tournaments
Kirin Cup
Winners (1): 2016
Millennium Super Cup
Runners-up (1): 2001

See also

Bosnia and Herzegovina men's national under-21 football team
Bosnia and Herzegovina men's national under-19 football team
Bosnia and Herzegovina men's national under-17 football team
Bosnia and Herzegovina men's national under-15 football team
Bosnia and Herzegovina women's national football team
Bosnia and Herzegovina women's national under-19 football team
Bosnia and Herzegovina women's national under-17 football team
Bosnian footballer of the year award – Idol of the nation

References

External links

Bosnia and Herzegovina national team at N/FSBiH (in Bosnian and English)
Bosnia and Herzegovina at FIFA (in English)
Bosnia and Herzegovina at UEFA (in English)
Bosnian Support Army  – Bosnian Support Army (in Bosnian and English)
Reprezentacija.ba – News site of Bosnian national team (in Bosnian)
SportSport.ba Portal – Sports news portal (in Bosnian)
Sport Centar Portal – Sports news portal (in Bosnian)
Sport.ba Portal – Sports news portal (in Bosnian)
Bosnian football results since 1998

1995 establishments in Bosnia and Herzegovina
 
European national association football teams